The final and the qualifying heats of the men's 4×200 metre freestyle relay event at the 1998 World Aquatics Championships were held on Tuesday 13 January 1998 in Perth, Western Australia.

Final

Qualifying heats

Heat 1

Heat 2

See also
1996 Men's Olympic Games 4x200m Freestyle (Atlanta)
1997 Men's World Championships (SC) 4x200m Freestyle (Gothenburg)
1997 Men's European Championships (LC) 4x200m Freestyle (Seville)
2000 Men's Olympic Games 4x200m Freestyle (Sydney)

References

Swimming at the 1998 World Aquatics Championships